Graham Gooch is a former cricketer who captained Essex and England.  He has scored centuries (100 or more runs in a single innings) in Test and One Day International (ODI) matches on twenty and eight occasions respectively, in an international career spanning nearly two decades. He is one of the most successful international batsmen of his generation; through a first-class career spanning from 1973 until 2000, he became the most prolific run scorer of all time with 67,057. With 8,900 runs, Gooch was the leading Test run-scorer for England until overtaken by Alastair Cook in 2015. Gooch is one of 25 players in history to have scored over 100 first-class centuries.  Having coached at Essex, he was full-time test batting coach for the England cricket team 2012–2014.

Five years after Gooch's  Test debut where he made a pair of ducks against Australia at Edgbaston in July 1975, he scored his first Test century with 123 against the West Indies at Lord's in June 1980.  Gooch's highest Test score is 333, which he made in the first innings against India in 1990.  As of August 2022, this is the third-highest Test score by an Englishman (after Len Hutton's 364 and Wally Hammond's 336 not out), and is the equal thirteenth-highest score in Test history.  He went on to score 123 in the second innings of the same Test match, becoming the sixth Englishman at that time to have scored a century in both innings of a Test match, and the first for over 40 years. Gooch is one of fewer than 60 batsmen to carry his bat in a Test innings when, in 1991 against the West Indies, he remained not out at the end of the England innings with a score of 154. He is also one of only seven cricketers in Test history, and the only on a score of 100 or greater, to have been dismissed by handling the ball, when he flicked the ball away from the stumps against Australia in 1993.

Gooch scored 32 on his One Day International (ODI) debut, against the West Indies at Scarborough in August 1976.  His first ODI century came in August 1980.  Scoring 108, and making an opening partnership of 154 with Geoffrey Boycott, Gooch's innings led England to a 47-run victory over Australia at Edgbaston. Gooch's highest ODI score is 142 which he achieved against Pakistan in November 1987.  As of August 2022, this is also the fifteenth-highest score by an Englishman in ODI history.

Key

Test cricket centuries

One Day International centuries

References

Gooch
Gooch, Graham